Abcoude is a town and former municipality in the Netherlands, in the province of Utrecht. Since 2011 it has been part of the municipality of De Ronde Venen.

Population centres 
The former municipality of Abcoude consisted of the villages Abcoude and Baambrugge, and the hamlet Stokkelaarsbrug.

Geography 
Abcoude lies in the Province Utrecht, about 13 km southeast of (the centre of) Amsterdam, on the confluence of the Angstel River, Gein River and Holendrecht River.

In 2001, the town of Abcoude had 6431 inhabitants. The built-up area of the town was 1.28 km², and contained 2678 residences.  The current approximation is over 8000.

History 

Abcoude was first mentioned in a report from 1085 by the bishop of Utrecht. In this document the residents of Abcoude were named ’habitatores de Abecenwalde’.
In 1672 most of the town was burned down by the French.
In 1820 Abcoude had 1100 inhabitants.

The municipality of Abcoude was formed in 1941, from the former municipalities of Abcoude-Proosdij (containing the village of Abcoude) and Abcoude-Baambrugge (containing the village of Baambrugge).

Transport 
The town is served by Abcoude railway station. It is in the northern part of Abcoude. The station offers direct services to Amsterdam, Utrecht, Gouda and Rotterdam.

Local government 
Till 2011 the municipal council of Abcoude consisted of 13 seats, which were divided as follows:
 CDA - 3 seats
 SVAB (local party) - 3 seats
 VVD - 3 seats
 PvdA - 2 seats
 D66 - 1 seat
 GroenLinks - 1 seat

Other 
Abcoude is known as the only town whose name starts with the letters A, B, and C in that order and ends with D and E in that order.

References 
 Statistics are taken from the SDU Staatscourant

External links

  
 A map of Abcoude
  Businesses in Abcoude

Municipalities of the Netherlands disestablished in 2011
Populated places in Utrecht (province)
Former municipalities of Utrecht (province)
De Ronde Venen